The men's doubles of the 2014 Advantage Cars Prague Open tournament was played on clay in Prague, Czech Republic.

The 2014 Advantage Cars Prague Open doubles was a professional tennis tournament played on clay courts in Prague, Czech Republic. Toni Androić and Andrey Kuznetsov were crowned champions, after defeating Roberto Maytín and Miguel Ángel Reyes-Varela 7–5, 7–5

Seeds

Draw

Draw

External Links
 Main Draw

Advantage Cars Prague Open - Doubles
2014 Doubles